Brown Herman (sometimes referred to as 'Herman Brown') is a northwest central neighborhood located just west of downtown Austin, Texas. It is often included within the boundaries of Tarrytown or Bryker Woods.

About 
The boundaries of the neighborhood are disputed however it is most commonly defined as the neighborhood west of MoPac Expressway, east of Exposition Boulevard, south of W. 35th Street, and north of Westover Road. However it is sometimes extended east to Scenic Drive and south to Windsor Road. It includes both residential streets as well as the Austin State Supported Living Center. In 2008, the median home price was listed at $654K for around 3,000 square feet.

Transportation 
The neighborhood is serviced by Capital Metro route, Nos. 21-22 (Exposition/Chicon).

Education
Brown Herman is located in the Austin Independent School District, and its children are served by these public schools:
Casis Elementary School
O. Henry Middle School
Austin High School

The neighborhood is also in close proximity to the Rawson Saunders School and The Girls' School of Austin.

References

Neighborhoods in Austin, Texas